This is a list of schools of landscape architecture. Universities and other institutions in many parts of the world offer qualifications in landscape architecture.

Americas

Canada
University of British Columbia (master's program and bachelor's in landscape architecture & urbanism)
University of Guelph
University of Manitoba (master's program and bachelor's in environmental design, landscape + urbanism stream)
Université de Montréal
University of Toronto (master's program only)
University of Calgary (Master of Landscape Architecture)
Dalhousie University (bachelor's program)

United States
Academy of Art University  (not LAAB approved)
Auburn University (master's program only)
Arizona State University (bachelor's and a new master's program)
University of Arizona (master's program only)
University of Arkansas (bachelor's program only)
Ball State University (bachelor's and master's program)
Boston Architectural College (BLA + MLA)
Brigham Young University Idaho (bachelors only)
California Polytechnic State University, San Luis Obispo (bachelor's program only)
California Polytechnic State University, Pomona
University of California, Berkeley 
University of California, Davis (bachelor's program only)
Chatham University (master's program only) (no new candidates, program closed)
University of Cincinnati (master's program only)
City College of New York (master's program only)
Clemson University
Colorado State University (bachelor's program, master's program introduced 2010)
University of Colorado Denver (master's program only)
University of Connecticut (bachelor's program only)
Cornell University (College of Agriculture and Life Sciences) (B.S. & M.L.A.)
University of Delaware (College of Agriculture and Natural Resources) (B.S.)
University of Florida (bachelor's and master's program)
Florida International University (FIU School of Architecture)
University of Georgia (College of Environment & Design)
Harvard University (master's program only)
University of Idaho (B.S. & M.L.A.)
University of Illinois at Urbana–Champaign
Illinois Institute of Technology
Iowa State University
Kansas State University
University of Kentucky (bachelor's program only)
Louisiana State University
University of Maryland, College Park (bachelor's and master's programs)
University of Massachusetts Amherst
Michigan State University (bachelor's program only)
University of Michigan (master's program only)
University of Minnesota (master's program only)
Mississippi State University
Morgan State University (master's program only)
University of Nebraska–Lincoln
University of Nevada, Las Vegas (bachelor's program only)
University of New Mexico (master's program only)
North Carolina A&T State University (bachelor's program only)
North Carolina State University
North Dakota State University (bachelor's program only)
Northeastern University
Ohio State University
Oklahoma State University (bachelor's program only)
University of Oklahoma (master's program only)
University of Oregon (B.L.A, M.L.A., PhD)
University of Pennsylvania (master's program only)
Pennsylvania State University (undergraduate and graduate programs: BLA, MLA, MSLA, PhD)
Philadelphia University (undergraduate: BLA)
Purdue University (bachelor's program only)
University of Rhode Island (bachelor's program only)
Rhode Island School of Design
Rutgers University (bachelor's program and recent master's program)
University of Southern California (MLA)
State University of New York - Environmental Science and Forestry (SUNY-ESF) (BLA, MLA, MS & BLA/MS Fast Track)
Temple University (Master of Landscape Architecture and Bachelor of Science Landscape Architecture)
Texas A&M University
Texas Tech University
University of Tennessee at Knoxville (master's program only)
University of Texas at Arlington (master's program only)
University of Texas at Austin (master's program only)
Utah State University (BLA, B+MLA accelerated degree, MLA, PhD)
Virginia Polytechnic Institute and State University
University of Virginia (master's program only)
Washington State University (accredited BLA and MSLA programs)
Washington University in St. Louis (master's program only)
University of Washington
West Virginia University (accredited BLA and MSLA programs)
University of Wisconsin–Madison (accredited BSLA and MSLA programs)

Mexico 
UNAM (Universidad Nacional Autonoma de Mexico)

Argentina 
UBA (Universidad de Buenos Aires) (bachelor's program)
Universidad Católica de Córdoba (master's program only)

Brazil 
UFRJ (Universidade Federal do Rio de Janeiro)

Colombia
Universidad Pontificia Bolivariana (master's program only)

Uruguay 
Universidad de la República - facultad de arquitectura y agronomia.

Europe

Austria 
University of Natural Resources and Life Sciences, Vienna - Landscape Architecture and Landscape Planning (bachelor and master)

Belgium 
Gembloux Agro-Bio Tech, University of Liège, ULB Faculty Architecture LaCambre Horta (bachelor and master), Gembloux
Hogeschool Gent - School of Arts (vakgroep Architectonisch Ontwerp) (bachelor), Ghent
Erasmushogeschool Brussel (bachelor), Anderlecht
Haute Ecole Lucia de Brouckère (bachelor), Anderlecht

Bulgaria 
University of Forestry – Sofia, Bulgaria (Master's program only)

France 
Agrocampus Ouest, Angers, Landscape engineer
ENSP Versailles, Lille, Bordeaux, Marseille, Landscape architect
ENSPNP Blois, Landscape architect
ESAJ, Paris, Landscape architect
Garden Design Academy, France (distance learning courses)

Germany 
Beuth University of Applied Sciences Berlin
Technical University of Berlin
Technische Universität Dresden
TU Dresden
Anhalt University of Applied Sciences
Leibniz University Hannover
Technical University of Munich
Weihenstephan-Triesdorf University of Applied Science

Nürtingen-Geislingen University of Applied Science

Hungary 
Szent István University  – Faculty of Landscape Architecture (BA/BSc, MA/MSc, MLA - 4 semester - English - Master programme)

Italy 
University of Pisa (master's degree in Design and Planning of green areas and the landscape)
University of Turin
University of Genoa
University of Bologna
University of Rome La Sapienza
University of Reggio Calabria (BA, PhD)
University of Florence (Master, PhD)
University of Perugia
University of Palermo
University of Naples Federico II (Master's program Faculty of Architecture, BSc Faculty of Agriculture)
University of Padua (bachelor's program only, Faculty of Agriculture)
Politecnico di Milano (Master's degree in Landscape Architecture - Land Landscape Heritage)

Ireland 
University College Dublin

Netherlands
Technische Universiteit Delft (TU Delft) Delft, The Netherlands
Wageningen University, Wageningen, the Netherlands
 Academy of Architecture, Amsterdam, The Netherlands

Norway 
Norwegian University of Life Sciences (NMBU) (5-year Master's program in Landscape Architecture)
The Oslo School of Architecture and Design (AHO) (5-year Master's program in Landscape architecture and 2-year Master's program in Landscape Architecture (to be discontinued) in Oslo and Tromsø)

Portugal 
Instituto Superior de Agronomia, Lisbon
Universidade do Porto, Porto
Universidade de Évora, Évora
Universidade do Algarve, Faro
Universidade de Trás-os-Montes e Alto Douro, Vila Real

Romania 
University of Agronomic Sciences and Veterinary Medicine - Faculty of Horticulture, Bucharest (4-year bachelor's degree in Landscape Architecture)
University of Architecture and Urban Planning "Ion Mincu" - Faculty of Landscape Architecture, Bucharest

Spain 
Escola Superior d'Agricultura de Barcelona. ESAB. Bachelor's Degree in Landscape Architecture.
Universidad Rey Juan Carlos. Bachelor's Degree in Landscape Architecture. 
Universidad Camilo José Cela, Madrid (Bachelor's Degree)
Cátedra de Paisajismo Castillo de Batres (Master's Degree and Doctoral Degree)
Escuela de Paisajismo y Jardinería Castillo de Batres (Continuing education: On-Campus and On-Line)
Escuela Gallega del Paisaje - Fundación Juana de Vega (Semi-distance master's degree in Landscape architecture)

See Academic Degree for Spain.

Sweden 
Swedish University of Agricultural Sciences Alnarp (SLU Alnarp). Alnarp campus is located next to Malmö in the southernmost part of Sweden, and close to Denmark's capital, Copenhagen. Alnarp has one of Europe's largest campuses for education in Landscape Design, Landscape Planning, Environmental Psychology and Landscape Management and Construction. The campus area includes the arboretum Alnarpsparken (one of Sweden's largest, with over 2,500 ligneous plants) and Alnarp Rehabilitation Garden, both of which are used in the education. Alnarp Rehabilitation Garden is mainly used for research and postgraduate education on the importance of nature and gardens for people's health and well-being, where not least the importance of the landscape design is explored. These prerequisites provide opportunities for in-depth studies in various areas of landscape architecture. SLU Alnarp offers a 3-year bachelor's degree or a 5-year master's degree in landscape architecture. In addition, there is a two-year international master's program in landscape architecture, where all education is offered in English.
Swedish University of Agricultural Sciences Ultuna (SLU Ultuna). Ultuna campus is adjacent to Uppsala, Sweden's oldest university city and close to Sweden's capital, Stockholm. SLU Ultuna offers a 3-year bachelor's degree or a 5-year master's degree in landscape architecture. In addition, there is a two-year international master's program in "Landscape Architecture for Sustainable Urbanisation", where all education is offered in English.

Turkey
Amasya University
Adnan Menderes University
Akdeniz University
Amasya University
Ankara University
Atatürk University
Bartın University
Bilkent University
Çanakkale Onsekiz Mart University
Çukurova University
Düzce University
Ege University
Istanbul Medipol University
Istanbul Technical University
Istanbul University
Işık University
İnönü University
Karadeniz Technical University
Namık Kemal University
Ordu University
Süleyman Demirel University
Trakya University
Yeditepe University
Yıldız Technical University

UK 
Writtle University College - Writtle School of Design (WSD)
Edinburgh College of Art
Birmingham City University
Kingston University, London
University of East London, London (MA in Landscape architect) 
University of Greenwich, London
University of Gloucestershire
Leeds Metropolitan University
Manchester Metropolitan University
University of Sheffield
Newcastle University (only PhD and MA in Future Landscape Imaginaries)
The Bartlett (University College London)

Other 
Faculty of Agriculture, University of Zagreb, Croatia
Mendel University in Brno, Czech Republic
Czech University of Life Sciences Prague in Prague, Czech Republic
Czech Technical University in Prague in Prague, Czech Republic
Tallinna Tehnikaülikool (Tallinn Technical University), Tallinn, Estonia
Eesti Maaülikool (Estonian University of Life Sciences), Tartu, Estonia
Estonian Academy of Arts, Tallinn, Estonia
Aalto University School of Arts, Design and Architecture, Finland
Technological Educational Institute of Eastern Macedonia and Thrace, Greece
Epirus University of Applied Sciences (TEI EP), Greece
Latvia University of Life Sciences and Technologies, Jelgava, Latvia
Vilnius Gediminas Technical University, Vilnius, Lithuania
Technische Universiteit Delft (TU Delft) Delft, The Netherlands
Wageningen University, Wageningen, the Netherlands
Warsaw University of Life Sciences, Warsaw, Poland
Cracow University of Technology, Cracow, Poland
Wroclaw University of Environmental and Life Sciences, Wroclaw, Poland
Faculty of Agriculture, University of Novi Sad, Serbia
Faculty of Forestry, University of Belgrade, Serbia
Slovak University of Agriculture Horticulture and Landscape Engineering Faculty, Nitra, Slovakia
Sveriges Lantbruksuniversitet, Alnarp, Sweden
Sveriges Lantbruksuniversitet, Uppsala, Sweden
HEPIA, Geneva, Switzerland
ETH Zurich, Zurich, Switzerland
Hochschule für Technik Rapperswil, Rapperswil-Jona, Switzerland
University of Copenhagen, Copenhagen, Denmark

Australia 
University of Adelaide
University of Canberra
University of Melbourne
University of New South Wales
Deakin University
Queensland University of Technology
RMIT University
University of Technology Sydney
University of Western Australia

New Zealand 
Lincoln University, School of Landscape Architecture
Unitec Institute of Technology
Victoria University of Wellington

Asia Pacific

China
Beijing Forestry University, China
Tsinghua University, China
Huaqiao University, Xiamen, China

Hong Kong
The University of Hong Kong
THEi
Hong Kong Design Institute (HKDI)

Indonesia
Trisakti University, Indonesia
Bogor Agricultural University, Indonesia
Bandung Institute of Technology, (Master only) Indonesia
 , Indonesia
Udayana University, Bali, Indonesia
Sumatera Institute of Technology, Lampung, Indonesia

Japan 
 Tokyo University of Agriculture Faculty of Regional Environmental Science Department of Landscape Architecture Science, Setagaya, Tokyo, Japan
 Tokyo University of Agriculture junior college Department of Environment and Landscape, Setagaya, Tokyo, Japan
 Chiba University (Matsudo Campus) Faculty of Horticulture, Department of Environment and Landscape, Chiba, Japan 
 Minami Kyushu University Faculty of Environment and Horticulture, Department of Environment and Horticulture, Miyazaki, Japan
 Nishi-nippon Junior College, Department of Environment and Horticulture, Fukuoka, Japan
 Kyushu University Graduate School of Design, Undergraduate Schools School of Design, Department of Environmental Design, Fukuoka, Japan
 Hokkaido University School of Agriculture, Department of Environmental Horticulture and Landscape Architecture, Hokkaido, Japan
 University of Tsukuba School of Art and Design, Program in Design, Division of Environmental Design, Ibaragi, Japan
 Kyoto University Graduate School of Agriculture, Division of Forest and Biomaterials Science, Lab of Landscape Architecture, Kyoto, Japan 
 Kyoto Prefectural University Graduate School of Life and Environmental Sciences, Lab of Landscape, Kyoto, Japan 
 Kyoto University of the Arts Undergraduate School Department of Environmental Design, Division of Landscape Design, Kyoto, Japan
 Kyoto University of the Arts Correspondence Education Undergraduate School Department of Design, Landscape Design Course, Kyoto, Japan
 Osaka Prefecture University Graduate schools of Life and Environmental Sciences, Division of Environmental Sciences and Technology, Lab of Landscape Architecture, Osaka, Japan
 Osaka University of Arts Environmental Design Department, Osaka, Japan
 Osaka University of Arts Environmental Design Department of Correspondence Education, Osaka, Japan
 Shinshu University Faculties of Agriculture (Minami-minowa Campus), Department of Forest Science Forest Environmental Sciences, Rural Environmental Engineering, Nagano, Japan
 Tohoku University of Art and Design Department of Architecture and Environmental Design, Educational field of landscape design, Yamagata, Japan
 Miyagi University School of Project Design - Department of Spatial Design and Information Systems or School of Food, Agricultural and Environmental Sciences - Department of Environmental Sciences, Sendai, Miyagi, Japan
 Nagaoka Institute of Design Department of Architecture and Environmental Design, Educational field of landscape design, Nagaoka, Niigata, Japan
 Nagoya University of Arts Graduate Program School of Design, Department of Design, Department of Design Space Block, Nagoya, Aichi, Japan
 Kobe Design University School of Design Department of Environmental Design Educational field of landscape design, Kobe, Hyogo, Japan
 Tama Art University Department of Environmental Design, Educational field of landscape design, Tokyo, Japan
 Meiji University School of Agriculture Department of Agriculture Division of Environment, Tokyo, Japan
 Nihon University College of Bioresource Sciences Department of Plant Science and Resources Lab of Landscape Architecture, Fujisawa, Kanagawa, Japan
 Nihon University Junior College (Shonan Campus) Department of Bioresource Sciences Laboratory of Landscape Architecture and Science, Fujisawa, Kanagawa, Japan
 Tokai University (Asahikawa Campus) School of Art and Technology Department of Architecture and Environment Design, Asahikawa, Hokkaido, Japan
 University of Shiga Prefecture School of Environmental Science Department of Environment Design and Architecture, Shiga, Japan
 University of Tokyo 
Graduate School of Agricultural and Life Sciences Department of Forest Science, Laboratories Forest Resources and Environmental Science - Forest Landscape Planning and Design, Tokyo, Japan
 University of Tokyo Graduate School of Engineering Department of Urban Engineering, Tokyo, Japan
 University of Tokyo Graduate School of Frontier Sciences Department of Ecosystem Studies Landscape Ecology and Planning, Tokyo, Japan
 Awaji Landscape Planning and Horticulture Academy, Awaji Island, Hyogo：University of Hyogo (Hyogo Prefectural University) Graduate School of Landscape Design and Management, Awaji Campus

Malaysia
Universiti Teknologi Malaysia
University Putra Malaysia
Universiti Teknologi MARA, Malaysia

Philippines
Bulacan State University, City of Malolos, Philippines
University of the Philippines Diliman, Philippines
University of San Carlos, Philippines

Republic of Korea (South Korea)
Seoul National University
Yeungnam University
Chongju University
University of Seoul
Shingu College
Kyunghee University
Gyeongnam National University of Science and Technology
Sungkyunkwan University
Sangji Yongseo College
Kyungnam College of Information and Technology
Kyungpook National University
Catholic University of Daegu
Dongguk University
Mokpo National University
Chonnam National University
Gachon University
Daegu University
Dong-A University
Pusan National University
Chonbuk National University
Kangwon National University
Sunchon University
Woosuk University
Honam University
Dongshin University
Gyeongju University
Hyechon University
Sangmyung University
Kongju National University
Hankyong National University
Pai Chai University
Gangneung-Wonju National University
Joongbu University
Sahmyook University
Sookmyung Women's University
Cheonan Yonam College
Korea National University of Cultural Heritage
Gumi College
Dankook University
Keimyung College University
Wonkwang University
Korea University
Sangji University
Seoul Women's University
Byuksung College
Kijeon University
World Cyber College
Dongkang College

Singapore
National University of Singapore, Singapore

Sri Lanka
University of Moratuwa, Sri Lanka

Taiwan
National Taiwan University, Taiwan
Fu Jen Catholic University, Taiwan
Tunghai University, Taiwan

Thailand
Chulalongkorn University, Bangkok, Thailand - Faculty of Architecture (5-year bachelor's degree in Landscape Architecture)
Maejo University, Chiang Mai, Thailand - Faculty of Architecture and Environmental Design (5-year bachelor's degree in Landscape Architecture)
Kasetsart University, Bangkok, Thailand - Faculty of Architecture (5-year bachelor's degree in Landscape Architecture)
Maha Sarakham University, Maha Sarakham, Thailand
Silpakorn University, Bangkok, Thailand
Thammasat University, Bangkok, Thailand

Middle East
American University of Beirut, Beirut, Lebanon
Université de Balamand, Académie Libanaise des Beaux-arts, Beirut, Lebanon
King Abdulaziz University, Jedda, Saudi Arabia
University of Dammam, Dammam, Saudi Arabia
Tehran University, Tehran, Iran
Shahid Beheshti University, Tehran, Iran
Tarbiat Modarres University, Tehran, Iran
Imam Khomeini International University, Qazvin, Iran
Technion, Haifa, Israel

Africa 
 Cairo University, Cairo, Egypt
University of Pretoria, South Africa (BSc + MLA) 
University of Cape Town, South Africa (Master's program only)
 Jomo Kenyatta University of Agriculture and Technology 
University of Dschang (bachelor's program, and master's program; Ebolowa school of wood, water, and natural resources, Faculty of agronomy and agricultural sciences FAAS)
 University of Lagos, Nigeria. School of Post Graduate Studies, Department of Architecture (Masters program only) 
Ahmadu Bello University, Zaria, Kaduna State, Nigeria. School of Postgraduate Studies, Department of Architecture. (PGDLA and MLA programs only)

References

External links
The International Federation of Landscape Architects (IFLA)
American Society of Landscape Architects
Canadian Society of Landscape Architects
The Landscape Institute The Chartered Institute in the UK for Landscape Architects
European council of landscape architecture schools
Landscape education: new opportunities for teaching and research in Europe
European Foundation of Landscape Architecture
Ontario Association of Landscape Architects
slic Student Landscape Institute Council (UK)
Australian Institute of Landscape Architects
Iranian Society of Landscape Professions
Graduate studies in Italy, AIAPP (Italian professional association)
Postgraduate studies in Italy, AIAPP (Italian professional association)
Università di Pisa
Sri Lanka Institute of Landscape Architects
Landscape Architecture Schools
Department of Landscape Architecture, Universiti Teknologi Malaysia
Accredited courses of the UK Landscape Institute